United States at the UCI Road World Championships is an overview of the American results at the UCI Road World Championships and UCI Junior Road World Championships.

List of medalists 

This a list of elite, under-23 American medals, but don't list the amateur events. Since the 2012 UCI Road World Championships there is the men's and women's team time trial event for trade teams and these medals are included under the UCI registration country of the team.

Sources

Other American medalists
From 2012 to 2018, there was the men's and women's team time trial event for trade teams and these medals are included under the UCI registration country of the team. Here are listed of the medalists who won a medal with a non-American-based team. Since 2019, these events were replaced with a single mixed team relay time trial event for national teams.

Most successful American competitors
The list don't include the men's amateur events

Medal table

Medals by year
The list don't include the men's amateur events

Medals by discipline
Updated during the 2015 UCI Road World Championships after 27 September

References

Nations at the UCI Road World Championships
United States at cycling events